This is a list of people reported killed by non-military law enforcement officers in the United States
prior to 2009in  , whether in the line of duty or not, and regardless of reason or method. The listing documents the occurrence of a death, making no implications regarding wrongdoing or justification on the part of the person killed or officer involved. Killings are arranged by date of the incident that caused death. Different death dates, if known, are noted in the description.

This page lists  people. The table below lists  people.

2008
The table below lists  people.

2007
The table below lists  people.

2006
The table below lists  people.

2005
The table below lists  people.

2004
The table below lists  people.

2003
The table below lists  people.

2002
The table below lists  people.

2001
The table below lists  people.

2000
The table below lists  people.

1990s
The table below lists  people.

1980s
The table below lists  people.

1970s
The table below lists  people.

Prior to 1970
The table below lists  people.

19th century

The table below lists  people.

See also

References

19th century in the United States
Killings by law enforcement officers in the United States prior to 2009

20th century in the United States
Killings by law enforcement officers in the United States prior to 2009
Killings by law enforcement officers in the United States prior to 2009

2000s in the United States
2008